Earth Force may refer to:

 Earth Force (Marvel Comics), a fictional superhuman team within the Marvel Comics universe consisting of three humans granted elemental powers by Seth
 EarthForce, the military of Babylon 5
 Earth Force (fictional power), a fictional power in Dengeki Sentai Changeman
 E.A.R.T.H. Force, a short-lived American television series

See also
 Earth Defense Force (disambiguation)